Lancashire is an English topographical surname, deriving from Lancashire, a county in Northern England.

Notable people with this surname include:

Geoffrey Lancashire (1933–2004), English scriptwriter
Olly Lancashire (born 1988), English footballer
Oswald Lancashire (1857–1934),  English sportsman
Sarah Lancashire (born 1964), English actress
Thomas Lancashire (born 1985), English middle-distance runner

English toponymic surnames